Cycas ophiolitica is a species of cycad, native to Queensland.

References

ophiolitica
Flora of Queensland